Massive Attack are an English trip hop collective formed in 1988 in Bristol by Robert "3D" Del Naja, Adrian "Tricky" Thaws, Andrew "Mushroom" Vowles and Grant "Daddy G" Marshall.

The debut Massive Attack album Blue Lines was released in 1991, with the single "Unfinished Sympathy" reaching the charts and later being voted the 63rd greatest song of all time in a poll by NME. 1998's Mezzanine (containing the top 10 single "Teardrop") and 2003's 100th Window charted in the UK at number one. Both Blue Lines and Mezzanine feature in Rolling Stones list of the 500 Greatest Albums of All Time.

The group has won numerous music awards throughout their career, including a Brit Award—winning Best British Dance Act, two MTV Europe Music Awards, and two Q Awards. They have released five studio albums that have sold over 13 million copies worldwide. Throughout their history, Massive Attack have been supporters and activists for political, human rights and environmental causes.

History
Deejays Daddy G, Andrew Vowles, musician and rapper Tricky, and graffiti artist-turned-rapper Robert Del Naja met as members of partying collective the Wild Bunch. One of the first homegrown soundsystems in the UK, the Wild Bunch became dominant on the Bristol club scene in the mid-1980s.

Massive Attack started as a spin-off production quartet in 1988, with the independently released song, "Any Love", sung by falsetto-voiced singer-songwriter Carlton McCarthy, and then they signed to Circa Records in 1990—committing to deliver six studio albums and a "best of" compilation. Circa became a subsidiary of, and was later subsumed into, Virgin Records, which in turn was acquired by EMI. Blue Lines (1991), was co-produced by Jonny Dollar and Cameron McVey, McVey also became their first manager. McVey (credited at the time as 'Booga Bear') and his wife, Neneh Cherry, provided crucial financial support and in-kind assistance to the early careers of Massive Attack, Portishead, and Tricky during this period, even paying regular wages to them through their Cherry Bear organisation. Massive Attack used guest vocalists, interspersed with their own sprechgesang stylings, on top of what became regarded as an essentially British creative sampling production; a trademark sound that fused down-tempo hip hop, soul, reggae and other eclectic references, musical and lyrical.

In the 1990s, the members worked increasingly separately. Adrian "Tricky" Thaws left Massive Attack in 1995 and Andrew Vowles (Mushroom) left Massive Attack in late 1999. Despite having taken Del Naja's side and participating in a webcast as a duo the following year, Grant Marshall (Daddy G) took a personal break in 2001. Marshall rejoined the band for their following tour in 2003 and 2004, and returned to a studio role in 2005, and also Thaws rejoined Massive Attack in early 2016.

Any Love beginnings
Unsigned, Mushroom (Andy Vowles), Daddy G (Grant Marshall), 3D (Robert Del Naja) and Tricky (Adrian Thaws) put out "Any Love" as a single, co-produced by Bristol double-act Smith & Mighty.

Blue Lines and "Unfinished Sympathy"

3D co-wrote Neneh Cherry's "Manchild", which peaked at number 5 in the UK single chart. Cameron McVey and Neneh Cherry helped them to record their first LP, Blue Lines, partly in their house, and the album was released in 1991 on Virgin Records.

The album used vocalists including Horace Andy and Shara Nelson, a former Wild Bunch cohort. MC's Tricky and Willie Wee, also once part of the Wild Bunch, featured, as well as Daddy G's voice on "Five Man Army". Neneh Cherry sang backing vocals on environmentalist anthem, "Hymn of the Big Wheel".

That year they released "Unfinished Sympathy" as a single, a string-arranged track at Abbey Road studio, scored by Will Malone, that went on to be voted the 10th greatest song of all time in a poll by The Guardian.

The group temporarily shortened their name to "Massive" on the advice of McVey to avoid controversy relating to the Gulf War. They returned to being "Massive Attack" for their next single, "Safe from Harm".

Protection and Melankolic

After Shara Nelson left, the band brought in Everything but the Girl's Tracey Thorn and Nicolette as vocalists and released "Protection" on 26 September 1994.

With McVey out of the picture, Massive Attack enlisted the production talents of former Wild Bunch Nellee Hooper to co-produce some songs on it, with Mushroom. Other tracks were co-produced by the Insects and 3D. A dub version, No Protection, was released the following year by Mad Professor. Protection won a Brit award for Best Dance Act. The other collaborators on Protection were Marius de Vries, Craig Armstrong, a Scottish classical pianist, and Tricky. Tricky's solo career was taking off at this time and he decided not to collaborate with Massive Attack after this.

1994/1995 was also the period of Portishead's Dummy and Tricky's Maxinquaye albums and the term "trip hop" was coined. The media started to refer to the "Bristol scene".

In 1995, Massive Attack started a label distributed by Virgin/EMI, Melankolic, and signed Craig Armstrong and a number of other artists such as Horace Andy, Alpha, Sunna, and Day One. The group espoused a non-interference philosophy that allowed the artists to make their albums in the way they wanted.

The same year the Insects became unavailable for co-production and having parted ways with Nellee Hooper, the band were introduced to Neil Davidge, a relatively unknown producer whose main claim to fame thus far had been an association with anonymous dance-pop outfit DNA. The first track they worked on was "The Hunter Gets Captured by the Game", a cover version sung by Tracey Thorn for the Batman Forever soundtrack. Initially, Davidge was brought in as engineer, but soon became producer.

The group increasingly fractured in the lead-up to the third album, Davidge having to co-produce the three producers' ideas separately. Mushroom was reported to be unhappy with the degree of the post-punk direction in which Del Naja, increasingly filling the production vacuum, was taking the band.

In 1997, the group contributed to the film soundtrack of The Jackal, recording "Superpredators (Metal Postcard)", a song containing a sample of Siouxsie and the Banshees' "Mittageisen" and "Dissolved Girl", a new song with vocals by Sarah Jay (that was later remixed for the next album), which was featured at the beginning of the 1999 film The Matrix, although it was not on the official soundtrack.

Later that year they released a single, "Risingson", from what would be their third album, Mezzanine.

Mezzanine, "Teardrop", Vowles's departure and Marshall's absence

In 1997, Del Naja became the band's main producer in the recording sessions that made Mezzanine, Massive Attack's most commercially successful album, selling nearly four million copies. It featured Neil Davidge as a sound engineer and co-producer, and Horace Andy and Elizabeth Fraser as the main guest vocalists. During recording, Angelo Bruschini became their permanent lead guitarist both in the studio and live.

The lead single, after "Risingson", was "Teardrop", sung by Elizabeth Fraser of Cocteau Twins. The song was accompanied by a video directed by Walter Stern, of an animatronic singing fetus. Horace Andy sang on three songs, including "Angel". A track the band made for the film The Jackal, "Dissolved Girl", sung by Sarah Jay, was remixed for inclusion on the record.

Mezzanine went on to win a Q Award for Best Album as well as being nominated for a Mercury Prize.

Touring extensively, friction between Mushroom and the others came to a head. Mushroom was unhappy with the direction of the group and having to appear on tour.

Around this time, Del Naja, with Davidge decamped into Ridge Farm studio with friends and band members of Lupine Howl (made up of former members of the band Spiritualized, including Damon Reece, who went on to be Massive Attack's permanent drummer and one of two live drummers) towards a fourth Massive Attack LP, taking things even further into a rock direction.

2001 also saw the release of Eleven Promos, a DVD of all Massive Attack's 11 music videos thus far, including "Angel", a £100,000+ promo.

100th Window, Marshall's return and Collected

With Daddy G temporarily no longer involved in the studio, Davidge and Del Naja steered "LP4" on their own. Enlisting the vocals of Sinéad O'Connor and Horace Andy, 100th Window was mastered in August 2002 and released in February 2003.

Featuring no samples or cover versions, 100th Window was not as critically well received in Britain as the other records, although the album received a warmer reception internationally, scoring a 75 out of 100 on review aggregation site Metacritic.

The group collaborated with Mos Def on the track "I Against I", which appeared on the "Special Cases" single and the soundtrack for Blade II. "I Against I" is also notable as the only track from the 100th Window sessions that features a writing credit from Daddy G.

Also in 2003, Del Naja was arrested on child porn allegations, which were reported widely in the media. Del Naja was soon eliminated as a suspect (although he was charged with ecstasy possession and unable to get a U.S. visa for a while) with Daddy G and fans proffering their support. The arrest affected the beginning of the 100th Window tour schedule.

100th Window sold over a million copies and was toured extensively (including Queen Square, Bristol—a one-off sell out concert set up in the city centre park, which was seen as a homecoming).

Afterwards, Del Naja and Davidge agreed to an offer from director Louis Leterrier, to score the entire soundtrack for Danny the Dog, starring Jet Li. Dot Allison, who had sung with the band on the 100th Window tour, sang the end titles track, "Aftersun". Del Naja and Davidge also scored the soundtrack for the Bullet Boy film, with Del Naja on the end titles' vocals.

In 2005, Daddy G started coming into the studio, although little came of the material. He decided to instead work with a production duo, Robot Club, in another studio, feeling that he would be more free to develop tracks in the way he wanted. Meanwhile, Del Naja and Davidge recorded with a number of different singers as well as creating a track named "Twilight", for UNKLE's War Stories album. Later that year, Massive Attack decided to release their contractually obliged compilation album Collected in 2006. They released it with a second disc, made up of previously released non-album songs and unreleased sketches.

"Weather Underground" / Heligoland era

In 2007, Del Naja and Davidge scored three soundtracks, In Prison My Whole Life (which featured a track called "Calling Mumia" with vocals by American rapper Snoop Dogg), Battle in Seattle and Trouble the Water.

In February 2007, Massive Attack hosted a charity benefit for the Hoping Foundation, a charity for Palestinian children. In 2008, it was announced that Massive Attack were to curate the UK's Southbank Meltdown, a week-long event. It was suggested in interviews that this event would inspire Massive Attack back into action, having spent several years drifting towards the completion of their fifth studio album.

Later that year, Del Naja and Daddy G headed to Damon Albarn's studios for some writing and jamming. Around this time, Davidge scored the soundtrack for a Paul McGuigan film, Push and in December, Del Naja completed the score for 44 Inch Chest with the Insects and Angelo Badalamenti.

Davidge and Del Naja got back together in 2009 with Daddy G to finish the fifth album, incorporating bits of the Albarn material. Later it was announced that the band were to headline the 2009 Bestival festival, and soon after that they were to tour the UK and Europe. In May, Robert Del Naja's instrumental "Herculaneum", featured in the film Gomorra, won an Italian award for Best Song. Later that month, Del Naja and Marshall picked up a special Ivor Novello award for Outstanding Contribution to British Music.

On 29 May Jonny Dollar died of cancer aged 45, survived by his wife and four children. Dollar was the programmer and hands-on producer behind Blue Lines, writing some of the melodies that were the basis for the string arrangements in "Unfinished Sympathy".

On 25 August their new EP, Splitting the Atom, was announced. The other new tracks on the EP were Tunde Adebimpe's "Pray For Rain", Martina Topley-Bird's "Psyche" and Guy Garvey's "Bulletproof Love". The latter two tracks appear as remixes of the album versions.

The fifth album was released on 12 November 2009, called Heligoland, after the German archipelago of Heligoland, after a previous project called "Weather Underground" was abandoned. Del Naja said "I think it's got definitely a more organic feel". The opening track, "Pray For Rain" featured guest vocals of TV on the Radio's Tunde Adebimpe. Damon Albarn, Martina Topley-Bird and Mazzy Star frontwoman Hope Sandoval also provide guest vocals on the album. Del Naja said in October 2010, to the Spinner website, that his plans were now for "unorthodox" releases of several EPs in 2011, rather than an album.

Ritual Spirit EP, the return of Tricky, and new songs
In a 2013 interview for his first solo art show since 2008, Del Naja confirmed that not only was new Massive Attack material in the works, but that rumours of a reunion with Tricky were true. Tricky had not been featured on a Massive Attack album since 1994's Protection.

On 5 February 2014, it was confirmed that Massive Attack would headline at Secret Solstice, a new music festival in Reykjavík in June. On 21 February 2015, it was confirmed through the Massive Attack Facebook page that they would be collaborating with Run the Jewels.

On 21 January 2016, the iPhone application "Fantom" was released. The application was developed by a team including Massive Attack's Del Naja and let users hear parts of four new songs by remixing them in real time, using the phone's location, movement, clock, heartbeat, and camera.

On 28 January 2016, Massive Attack released a new EP, Ritual Spirit, which includes the four songs released on Fantom. The EP was written and produced by Del Naja and new collaborator, Euan Dickinson.

It was their first release since the 2011 Four Walls / Paradise Circus collaboration with Burial, and the first time since 1994 that Tricky had been featured on Massive Attack content. Scottish hip-hop group Young Fathers, London rapper Roots Manuva and singer Azekel also featured on the EP.

On 26 July 2016, Massive Attack previewed three new songs: "Come Near Me", "The Spoils", and "Dear Friend" on the Fantom iPhone application on which they previously previewed the four songs from the Ritual Spirit EP.

On 29 July 2016, they released a new EP, "The Spoils", which includes "The Spoils" and "Come Near Me", both previewed on Fantom. "The Spoils" features vocals from American singer-songwriter Hope Sandoval, and "Come Near Me" features British vocalist Ghostpoet. A music video for "Come Near Me", directed by Ed Morris, and featuring Kosovan actress Arta Dobroshi, was released the same day as the single. The video for "The Spoils", featuring Cate Blanchett, and directed by Australian director John Hillcoat, was released on 9 August 2016.

Eutopia EP and audiovisual releases
In July 2020, Massive Attack released a political audiovisual EP called Eutopia. The three track fusion was created across five cities during the COVID-19 global lockdown period, and was part-formed by generative algorithmic visuals from AI art pioneer Mario Klingemann and collaborations with Algiers, Young Fathers and US poet Saul Williams. The conceptual project, co-written and produced by 3D and documentary filmmaker Mark Donne, featured strong arguments for global system change from UN Paris Climate Agreement author Christiana Figueres, founder of the Universal Basic Income Principle Professor Guy Standing and inventor of the US "Wealth Tax" policy Professor Gabriel Zucman.

Each video ends with a quote from Thomas More's Utopia.

Massive Attack were scheduled to headline the 2022 edition of the Primavera Sound music festival in Barcelona, Spain, but an unnamed band member's serious illness forced the band to cancel its appearance with the rest of its European tour.

Musical style
Some of their most noted songs have been without choruses and have featured dramatically atmospheric dynamics, conveyed through either distorted guitar crescendos, lavish orchestral arrangements or prominent, looped/shifting basslines, underpinned by high and exacting production values, involving sometimes copious digital editing and mixing. The pace of their music has often been slower than prevalent British dance music of the time. These and other psychedelic, soundtrack-like and DJist sonic techniques, formed a much-emulated style journalists began to dub "trip hop" from the mid-nineties onwards, though in an interview in 2006, Daddy G said, "We used to hate that terminology [trip-hop] so bad,' laughs. 'You know, as far we were concerned, Massive Attack music was unique, so to put it in a box was to pigeonhole it and to say, "Right, we know where you guys are coming from.""

Other projects

'Fire Sale' exhibition
A solo exhibition of Del Naja's art was held at the Lazarides gallery in central London, from 24 May to 22 June 2013. The show's content spanned a period of over twenty years and featured many of the art pieces that Del Naja created for Massive Attack. Each piece, reinterpreted especially for the exhibition, was hand-printed and finished. The show also featured three one-off 'digital infinity mirrors', two of which contained phrases supplied by Reprieve that were extracted from drone pilot dialogues. Del Naja performed a DJ set during the opening night on 23 May 2013.

Massive Attack and Adam Curtis
Del Naja conceived and designed an eight-night festival with filmmaker Adam Curtis—in collaboration with UVA (United Visual Artists)—that premiered in Manchester, UK in July 2013. The festival featured Curtis's film, unofficially titled The Plan, which was projected on a huge screen surrounding the audience, while music from Massive Attack was interweaved throughout the film. Del Naja, who orchestrated the film's soundtrack, described the experience as a "collective hallucination" and the film was also shown at the Manchester International Festival in July 2013. Music created by Del Naja for the festival became the score for a BBC production entitled HyperNormalisation in 2016.

In 2019, Del Naja and Adam Curtis teamed up for a second time on a live show based on the band's Mezzanine album. The show challenged the idea of nostalgia and power, and featured machine learning GANS and deep fakes from Mario Klingemann, as well as new films from Curtis that were used to tell a narrative story. They were used as visuals for cover versions of non Massive Attack songs based on samples and loops that made up the album's identity.

Mezzanine DNA
In April 2019, it was reported that Massive Attack had encoded Mezzanine into DNA to mark the 20th anniversary of the seminal 1998 album.
The album has also been made available in the form of a matte black spray paint can. A limited number of spray cans will contain the DNA encoded audio within matte black paint and each can will contain approximately one million copies of the album. Addressing the novel storage method, Del Naja – who is also known as a graffiti artist as ‘3D' – said: “It’s a creative way to store your back catalogue, although DNA-encoded spray paint is unlikely to be adopted by street artists seeking anonymity”.

Decarbonisation project 
On 28 November 2019, Robert Del Naja announced that Massive Attack partnered with a research centre based at the University of Manchester to explore the music industry's climate impact. He wrote in a column in The Guardian: "the commissioning of the renowned Tyndall Centre for Climate Change Research to map the full carbon footprint of typical tour cycles, and to look specifically at the three key areas where CO2 emissions in our sector are generated." This will include information about band travel and production, audience transport and venue. "The resulting roadmap to decarbonisation will be shared with other touring acts, promoters and festival/venue owners to assist swift and significant emissions reductions." (See 'Environmentalism' below)

Activism and politics

Anti-war advocacy 
Robert Del Naja was critical of the policies of the UK government under Tony Blair. He was strongly opposed to the 2003 war against Iraq, and with fellow musician Damon Albarn personally paid for full-page advertisements against the war in the NME magazine.

Massive Attack have worked with Campaign for Nuclear Disarmament and Stop the War Coalition, while also having helped fund a legal challenge to military intervention in international courts.

Human rights 
In 2008, Massive Attack curated the annual Meltdown festival on London's South Bank. During the two weeks of live performance, cinema and art, they worked with human rights lawyer Clive Stafford Smith and his organisation Reprieve which uses the law to enforce the human rights of prisoners.

In 2010, the video shot by Adam Broomberg and Oliver Chanarin for the song "Saturday Come Slow", featuring Albarn, drew attention to the use of music in torture.

Massive Attack donated all proceeds from their 2010 EP Atlas Air to War Child, a charity the band previously supported when they contributed to The Help Album.

In late July 2014, Del Naja and Marshall visited the Bourj El-Barajneh refugee camp in Lebanon to meet with Palestinian volunteers at an educational centre. The band's profit from the show in Byblos was donated to the centre.

In 2017, Massive Attack performed three shows in support of Hoping, an organisation that helps raise money and supports projects for Palestinian youth in refugee camps in the Gaza Strip and the West Bank, Lebanon and Syria.

British politics 
In 2007, Del Naja, musicians Albarn and Brian Eno, and United Visual Artists contributed to a Greenpeace demonstration against the renewal of the Trident nuclear programme that was held on board the Arctic Sunrise on the River Thames.

On 14 November 2012, on the eve of the Bristol Mayor election, the band caused some surprise by endorsing independent millionaire and former Liberal Democrat George Ferguson, citing the need for a mayor who would help facilitate creative projects to the city, and wasn't simply following a party political agenda. Previously, Del Naja had openly criticised Ferguson for being a member of the Society of Merchant Venturers, an organisation dating back to the 16th century which had many connections with the Bristol slave trade. Del Naja endorsed Ferguson again in the 2016 election.

in September 2018, Massive Attack criticised the Mayor of Bristol for cancelling the Bristol Arena project in the Temple Meads area of Bristol. The Mayor had announced a private sector company, YTL would build a privately funded arena in Filton, a northern suburb of Bristol and the band announced they would not play there. Despite this, when a pop up arena was temporarily erected on the Filton site, Massive Attack played two gigs in March 2019.

In November 2019, along with other public figures, Massive Attack signed a letter supporting Labour Party leader Jeremy Corbyn describing him as "a beacon of hope in the struggle against emergent far-right nationalism, xenophobia and racism in much of the democratic world" and endorsed him in the 2019 UK general election.

International politics 
During a concert in Istanbul in 2014, Massive Attack named those who died in anti-government protests on the outdoor screen at their back with the following sentences: "Their killers are still out there" and "We won't forget Soma".

Massive Attack have previously played two shows in Israel, but have declined recent offers. They have described this "not an action of aggression towards the Israeli people" but "towards the [Israeli] government and its policies", arguing that "the Palestinians [in Gaza and the West Bank] have no access to the same fundamental benefits that the Israelis do."

Del Naja and Thom Yorke of Radiohead threw an unofficial party at the occupied UBS building in the city of London in December 2011, in support for the international Occupy movement.

Environmentalism 
In 2010, Massive Attack donated the income from a Lincoln car commercial to the clean up campaign after the Deepwater Horizon oil spill.

Since October 2018, Massive Attack have also been supporting the climate activists of the Extinction Rebellion group, also known as XR, which conducted protests in London in October 2018 then April 2019. On 21 April, Massive Attack played a DJ set for the Extinction Rebellion protesters in the heart of London in Marble Arch. In July and October 2019, the group protested in 60 other cities worldwide, Robert Del Naja providing a portable radio network using speakers in backpacks with receivers and transmitters for the campaigners in London.

In 2021 the band published a report they had commissioned from the Tyndall Centre for Climate Change Research. The report examined the impact of live music on the environment and gave a set of recommendations for meeting the Paris agreement targets. Del Naja criticised the UK government for not doing more to meet the targets.Massive Attack became the first band globally  to commit their touring companies to the UN “Race to Zero” – Paris 1.5 compatible emissions reductions schedule.

Other 
In 2005, Del Naja organised and performed at a charity concert in Bristol for Tsunami Relief with Adrian Utley and Geoff Barrow of Portishead. The two-night event featured Massive Attack, Portishead, Robert Plant, the Coral and Albarn.

In March 2018, following the Facebook–Cambridge Analytica data scandal, Massive Attack suspended their Facebook page, stating: "In light of Facebook’s continued disregard for your privacy, their lack of transparency and disregard for accountability – Massive Attack will be temporarily withdrawing."

Band members

Current members
 Robert "3D" Del Naja – vocals, keyboards, guitars, programmer, arranger, producer, mixer (1988–present)
 Adrian "Tricky" Thaws – vocals, keyboards, bass, producer (1988–1995; 2016–present)
 Grant "Daddy G" Marshall – vocals, keyboards, guitars, programmer, producer (1988–2001; 2005–present)

Former members
 Andrew "Mushroom" Vowles – keyboards, drums, turntables, arranger, producer, mixer, programmer (1988–1999)
 Neil Davidge – bass, guitars, drums, keyboards, piano, occasional backing vocals (1998–2012)
 Horace Andy – vocals (1990–2011)
 Shara Nelson – vocals (1990–1994)
 Tracey Thorn – vocals, guitars (1994–1996)
 Stephanie Dosen – vocals, guitars (2008–2010)

Touring members
 Elizabeth Fraser – vocals, guitars (1998–present)
 Deborah Miller – vocals, percussion (1990–present)
 Horace Andy – vocals (1990–present)
 Angelo Bruschini – guitars (1995–present)
 Alex Lee – guitars (2019–present)
 Winston Blissett – bass guitar (1995–present)
 Damon Reece – drums (2006–present)
 Julien Brown – electronic drums (2014–present)
 Euan Dickinson – keyboards (2016–present)

Former touring members
 Kwame Boaten – bass (1996-1999)
 Andrew Smalls – drums, electronic drums (1995-2008)
 John Pierce – bass (1998-1999)
 Michael Timothy – keyboards, samples (1998)
 Hazel Fernandez – vocals (2004)
 Yolanda Quartey – vocals (2004)
 Azekel – vocals (2016)
 Dot Allison – vocals, guitar, electronic drums (2003)
 Arden Hart – keyboards (2003, 2006)
 Lucy Wilkins – violin, keyboards (2003)
 John Baggott - keyboards, samples, synthesizers (2008-2010)

Timeline

Discography

 Blue Lines (1991)
 Protection (1994)
 Mezzanine (1998)
 100th Window (2003)
 Heligoland (2010)

Awards and nominations

Billboard Music Awards
The Billboard Music Awards honor artists for commercial performance in the U.S., based on record charts published by Billboard. The awards are based on sales data by Nielsen SoundScan and radio information by Nielsen Broadcast Data Systems. The award ceremony was held from 1990 to 2007, until its reintroduction in 2011.

|-
| rowspan=2|2003
| Massive Attack
| Top Electronic Artist
| 
|-
| 100th Window
| Top Electronic Album
|

D&AD Awards
Design and Art Direction (D&AD) is a British educational charity which exists to promote excellence in design and advertising.

|-
| rowspan=3|1999
| rowspan=2|"Teardrop"
| Direction
| style="background:#FFBF00"| Yellow Pencil
|-
| Special Effects
| style="background:#BF8040"| Wood Pencil
|-
| Massive Attack - Teaser
| Music Packaging and Print Promotion/Promotional Poster
| style="background:#FFBF00"| Yellow Pencil
|-
| rowspan=2|2011
| "Splitting the Atom"
| Music Video
| style="background:#BF8040"| Wood Pencil
|-
| "Atlas Air"
| Animation
| style="background:#8a8b89"| Graphite Pencil

Denmark GAFFA Awards
Delivered since 1991. The GAFFA Awards (Danish: GAFFA Prisen) are a Danish award that rewards popular music awarded by the magazine of the same name.

|-
| rowspan=2|1999
| Mezzanine
| Best Foreign Album
| 
|-
| "Teardrop"
| Best Foreign Music Video
|

Edison Awards
The Edison Award is an annual Dutch music prize, awarded for outstanding achievements in the music industry. It is one of the oldest music awards in the world, having been presented since 1960.

|-
| 1992
| rowspan=2|Themselves
| Best International Dance/Hip-Hop
| 
|-
| 1999
| Best International Group
|

Fryderyk
The Fryderyk is an annual award ceremony in Poland, presented by the Związek Producentów Audio Video, the IFPI Poland, since 1994.

|-
| 1998
| Mezzanine
| Best Foreign Album
|

GAFFA Awards
Delivered since 1991. The GAFFA Awards (Danish: GAFFA Prisen) are a Danish award that rewards popular music, awarded by the GAFFA magazine.

|-
| 1998
| "Teardrop"
| Årets Udenlandske Musikvideo
|

Hungarian Music Awards
Hungarian Music Awards is the national music awards of Hungary, held every year since 1992 and promoted by Mahasz.

|-
| 1999
| Mezzanine
| New Trend Album of the Year
| 
|-
| 2011
| Heligoland
| Alternative Music Album of the Year
|

International Dance Music Awards

The International Dance Music Award was established in 1985. It is a part of the Winter Music Conference, a weeklong electronic music event held annually.

|-
| 2011
| "Paradise Circus"
| Best Underground Dance Track
|

Ivor Novello Awards
The Ivor Novello Awards are awarded for songwriting and composing. The awards, named after the Cardiff born entertainer Ivor Novello, are presented annually in London by the British Academy of Songwriters, Composers and Authors (BASCA).

|-
| 2009
| Themselves
| Outstanding Contribution to British Music
|

MTV Europe Music Awards
The MTV Europe Music Awards were established in 1994 by MTV Europe to celebrate the most popular music videos in Europe. Massive Attack has received two awards from three nominations.

|-
| 1995 || "Protection" || Best Video || 
|-
| rowspan="2"| 1998 || "Teardrop" || Best Video ||
|-
| Mezzanine || Best Album || 
|-

NME Awards
The NME Awards are annual music awards show founded by the music magazine NME.

|-
| rowspan=3|1999
| Themselves
| Best Group
| 
|-
| Mezzanine
| Best Album
| 
|-
| "Teardrop"
| Best Single
| 
|-
| 2000
| "Unfinished Sympathy"
| Best Ever Single
|

Q Awards
The Q Awards is the UK's annual music awards held by music magazine Q for excellence in music. Massive Attack has received two awards from two nominations.

|-
|rowspan="1"| 1998 || Mezzanine || Best Album || 
|-
|rowspan="1"| 2008 || Massive Attack || Innovation in Sound Award || 
|-

Brit Awards
The Brit Awards are the British Phonographic Industry's annual pop music awards.

|-
|rowspan="2"| 1996 || "Protection" ||Best British Video || 
|-
| Massive Attack || Best British Dance Act || 
|-
|rowspan="5"| 1999 || Mezzanine || MasterCard British Album || 
|-
|rowspan="2"| "Teardrop" || Best British Single || 
|-
| Best British Video || 
|-
|rowspan="2"| Massive Attack || Best British Group || 
|-
| Best British Dance Act || 
|-

UK Music Video Awards
The UK Music Video Awards is an annual celebration of creativity, technical excellence and innovation in music video and moving image for music.

|-
|rowspan="3"| 2010 || "Paradise Circus" || rowspan="2"| Best Dance Video || 
|-
|rowspan="2"| "Splitting the Atom" || 
|-
| Best Animation in a Video || 
|-
|rowspan="2"| 2011 || rowspan="2"| "Atlas Air" || Best Animation in a Video || 
|-
| Best Visual Effects in a Video || 
|-

Viva Comet Awards
VIVA Comet Awards were an annual awards ceremony, organised by VIVA Germany.

|-
| 1995
| Massive Attack
| Best Avantgarde Act
|

Žebřík Music Awards

!Ref.
|-
| 1998
| "Teardrop"
| Best International Video
| 
| 
|-
| 2006
| Collected
| Best International Music DVD
| 
|

Notes

Bibliography
Chemam, Melissa, Massive Attack: Out of the Comfort Zone, Tangent Books (2019) ,

References

External links

 
 
 'Massive Attack: Out of the Comfort Zone'

Brit Award winners
MTV Europe Music Award winners
English electronic music groups
Musical groups from Bristol
Musical groups established in 1988
Trip hop groups
British musical trios
Virgin Records artists
Musical collectives
British environmentalists
Political music groups
1988 establishments in England
Environmental musical artists